"Zusammen" ("Together") is a song by German hip hop group Die Fantastischen Vier featuring Clueso and a single from the Die Fantastischen Vier album Captain Fantastic. It peaked at number 2 on the German charts, at number 32 in Austria, and at number 35 in Switzerland. It was chosen as the official song for the 2018 FIFA World Cup by the German broadcaster Das Erste. It was played throughout the channel's coverage.

Writing and production
The song was written by Andreas Rieke, Michael "Smudo" Schmidt, Thomas Dürr ("Thomas D"), Michael "Michi" Beck, Thomas Burchia, Samy Sorge, Michael Kurth, Conrad Hensel, Florian Renner, Ricco Schoenebeck, and Toni Oliver Schoenebeck. It was produced by DJ Thomilla, Conrad Hensel, and Hitnapperz.

Music video
In the music video, the manager of the band, Bär Läsker, forces them to found a new group called "Fanta 5" because of the falling sales, in which Clueso is a new member. While the other band members are sceptical, Fanta 4 member Michi Beck rejects Clueso and is quarreling with him in some scenes of the video. In other scenes the two are reconciling and dancing together.

Charts

Weekly charts

Year-end charts

Certifications

References

2018 singles
Die Fantastischen Vier songs
2018 songs